Pleuromastigaceae is an obsolete family of cryptomonads, which included genera Monomastix, Pleuromastix, and Xanthodiscus.

Today, Monomastix is regarded as a green alga, and since 1987 Xanthodiscus is regarded as a synonym of Prorocentrum. Pleuromastix remains unclassified as a part of any larger taxon as of 2019.

References 

Cryptomonads